"Alt det jeg ville have sagt" is the debut single by Danish singer Basim. The song was released in Denmark on 11 August 2008 as the lead single from his debut studio album Alt det jeg ville have sagt (2008). The song peaked at number 34 on the Danish Singles Chart.

Track listing

Chart performance

Weekly charts

Release  history

References

2008 debut singles
2008 songs
Basim songs
Universal Music Group singles